King College may refer to:

 King College of Technology, Namakkal, Tamil Nadu, India
 King University, formerly King College, Bristol, Tennessee, United States

See also
 King College Prep, high school in Chicago
 King's College (disambiguation)